

Viktor Schütze (16 February 1906 – 23 September 1950), was a German U-boat commander during World War II. He was a recipient of the Knight's Cross of the Iron Cross with Oak Leaves of Nazi Germany.

Schütze was born in Flensburg, and started his naval career in the Reichsmarine aboard German torpedo boats in April 1925, before transferring to the new U-boat division ten years later in October 1935. When war broke out he commanded , with which he sailed on three patrols, mainly in the Bay of Biscay and off the Portuguese coast.

In July 1940 he assumed command over the Type IXB , and commanded for four patrols in North Atlantic and African waters. In December he received the Knight's Cross of the Iron Cross for his successes. In August 1941 he retired from front service, taking up positions as Flottillenchef of 2nd U-boat Flotilla. In March 1943 he became the FdU Ausbildungsflottillen (Commander of the training flotillas in the Baltic Sea) in Flensburg-Kappeln, in which position he served until the end of the war. He died in Frankfurt am Main in 1950.

Awards
 Spanisches Marineverdienstkreuz, I. Class in white (21 August 1939)
 Iron Cross (1939) 2nd Class (13 November 1939) & 1st Class (21 February 1940)
 Italienisches Kriegskreuz with swords (1 November 1941)
 Knight's Cross of the Iron Cross with Oak Leaves
 Knight's Cross on 11 December 1940 as Korvettenkapitän and commander of U-103
 Oak Leaves on 14 July 1941 as Korvettenkapitän and commander of U-103
 War Merit Cross with swords, 2nd Class (30 January 1944) & 1st Class (1 September 1944)

References

Citations

Bibliography

 
 
 

1906 births
1950 deaths
U-boat commanders (Kriegsmarine)
People from Flensburg
People from the Province of Schleswig-Holstein
Recipients of the Knight's Cross of the Iron Cross with Oak Leaves
Reichsmarine personnel
Military personnel from Schleswig-Holstein
Kriegsmarine personnel of World War II